Marwazi or al-Marwazi is a nisba meaning "from Merv", a historical city in (early Khorasan and present day Central Asia), near today's Mary in Turkmenistan. It may refer to:

 ʿĪsā al-Marwazī (fl. 9th century), Syriac lexicographer
 Habash al-Hasib al-Marwazi (died after 869), Persian astronomer, geographer, and mathematician who described trigonometric ratios
 Ibn Qutaybah or Abū Muhammad Abd-Allāh ibn Muslim ibn Qutayba al-Dīnawarī al-Marwazī (828–885), Islamic scholar
 Abu'l-Abbas Marwazi, 9th-century Persian poet
 'Abdallah ibn Muhammad ibn Yazdad al-Marwazi (died 875), senior Persian official of the Abbasid Caliphate in the mid-9th century
 Yusuf ibn Muhammad ibn Yusuf al-Marwazi, 9th-century governor of Adharbayjan and Arminiyah for the Abbasid Caliphate
 Kisai Marvazi, 10th-century Persian poet
 Shams al-Dīn al-Marwazī, (1077 – ), medieval astronomer
 Abu Tahir Marwazi, 12th-century prominent Persian philosopher from Khwarezmia
 Sharaf al-Zaman al-Marwazi, 11th–12th-century physician and author of Nature of Animals

Arabic-language surnames